Iran Insurance Joint-stock Company (Shirkat-e Sihami-ye Bimih Iran) is an Iranian government-owned corporation providing a wide range of insurances. Established in 1935, the company is regarded as "Iran's largest insurance corporation" and holds over 50% of the national market share. All of insurance services will offer in individual and legal agencies such as Etemad Gostar Hakim agency company or in legal intermediaries

See also 
 Insurance agents and brokers in Iran
 Banking and insurance in Iran

Notes

References 

Insurance companies of Iran
1935 establishments in Iran
Financial services companies established in 1935
Government-owned insurance companies
Iranian brands
Government-owned companies of Iran
Iranian entities subject to the U.S. Department of the Treasury sanctions